Single Collection is the first compilation album by Japanese singer and songwriter Rina Aiuchi. It was released on 17 December 2003 by Giza Studio. The album reached number 8 on the Oricon albums chart in its first week and charted for ten weeks.

Track listing

Charts

Weekly charts

Monthly charts

Certification and sales

References 

2003 compilation albums
Being Inc. compilation albums
Giza Studio albums
Japanese-language compilation albums